The Portuguese football league system consists of several leagues bound together hierarchically by promotion and relegation. Reserve teams are allowed to compete in the main league system, as is the case with most of Europe. However, they are not allowed to compete in the same tier as their senior team, thus no reserve team has ever competed in Portugal's top flight, the Primeira Liga.

Men's league system 
The Portuguese men's football league system consists of four national divisions and up to four district leagues (depending on the district).

National leagues 
All four national divisions provide access to the Portuguese Cup. The first two leagues are operated by the Portuguese Professional Football League, and they also guarantee participation in the Portuguese League Cup. Lastly, the third and fourth divisions are divided into two and four leagues respectively and are the only divisions operated by the Portuguese Football Federation. The federation announced the creation of Liga 3 (League 3) for 2021–22.

District leagues 
District leagues are operated by 22 District Associations: 18 from each district, plus 1 from Madeira Islands, and 3 from Azores Islands (western, central and eastern groups). The winner of each district league is promoted to the fourth national tier, the Campeonato de Portugal. Moreover, all district leagues provide access to their correspondent district cup, and the winner of the district cup, along with the second-placed team in the district league, is allowed to participate in the next season's Portuguese Cup. The bottom tier of each association is open to any new club or reserve team based on that district.

Women's league system 
The Portuguese women's football league system consists of three national divisions and no district leagues.

All divisions provide access to the Women's Portuguese Cup and are operated by the Portuguese Football Federation. The second and third divisions are divided in series by geographical proximity.

See also
 List of association football competitions#Portugal
 Portuguese football competitions

References

 
Portugal